was a Japanese economist and professor emeritus of Hitotsubashi University and Waseda University. He graduated from Hitotsubashi University in 1966.  His research interests were in social choice theory and welfare economics. He was also a Fellow of the Econometric Society.　He was named a Person of Cultural Merit in 2017.

Selected publications

Books

Chapters in books

Journal articles

See also 
 Extended sympathy
 Social welfare function

Notes

References 
 Mark Blaug and  Howard R. Vane, 2003.  ''Who's Who in Economics', pp. 813-814.

External links 
   Institute of Economic Research,  Members: Kotaro Suzumura Picture,  brief listing of education and positions, and a personal statement of previous research interests and current research projects.
 Kotaro Suzumura at IDEAS Personal details, affiliation, and works (working papers, articles, edited volumes, and citations).
 Curriculum Vitae 9 pp., April, 2006.

1944 births
2020 deaths
People from Tokoname
21st-century Japanese  economists
20th-century Japanese economists
Hitotsubashi University alumni
Academic staff of Hitotsubashi University
Academic staff of Waseda University
People from Aichi Prefecture
Fellows of the Econometric Society
Presidents of the Japanese Economic Association
Members of the Japan Academy
Persons of Cultural Merit
Recipients of the Medal with Purple Ribbon
Recipients of the Order of the Sacred Treasure
Deaths from pancreatic cancer